Shelby High School is the name of several high schools in the United States:

 Shelby High School (Michigan), in Shelby, Oceana County, Michigan
 Shelby High School (Montana), in Shelby, Montana
 Shelby High School (Nebraska), in Shelby, Nebraska
 Shelby High School (North Carolina), in Shelby, North Carolina
 Shelby High School (Ohio), in Shelby, Ohio